Walter Demel (born 1 December 1935) is a West German cross-country skier who competed during the 1960s and 1970s. He won a bronze medal in the 30 km event at the 1966 FIS Nordic World Ski Championships.

Demel's best finish at the Winter Olympics was 5th in the 30 km and 50 km events in 1972.

He was born in Bayreuth, Bavaria, Germany.

References
 . Incorrect F.I.S listing under Soviet Nationality

External links 
 
 

1937 births
Living people
German male cross-country skiers
Cross-country skiers at the 1964 Winter Olympics
Olympic cross-country skiers of the United Team of Germany
Cross-country skiers at the 1968 Winter Olympics
Cross-country skiers at the 1972 Winter Olympics
Cross-country skiers at the 1976 Winter Olympics
Olympic cross-country skiers of West Germany
FIS Nordic World Ski Championships medalists in cross-country skiing
Sportspeople from Bayreuth